Jamie's Ministry of Food is a four-part Jamie Oliver food docu-series that aired from 30 September to 21 October 2008.

Premise
The series was based in Rotherham, South Yorkshire. Oliver aimed to make the town "the culinary capital of the United Kingdom" and tried to get the town's inhabitants to learn how to cook fresh food and establish healthy eating as part of daily life.

The title of the show is a play on the Ministry of Food that existed during the Second World War to help people eat well despite food rationing. A companion cookbook of the same name was also released.

Pass It On 
The 'Pass It On' campaign also featured in this series with the local townspeople being taught a selection of recipes and passing them on to family members and friends.  The concept of the 'Pass It On' campaign was that if Oliver taught 8 people how to cook some simple recipes, and they each 'passed it on' to 2 people, then in 15 steps, the whole of the town would be cooking.  Oliver also organized several other 'Pass it On' events in workplaces and at social gatherings.

The 'Pass It On' campaign has a small following on the social networking website Facebook which has a group and fan page with users signing up to chart their progress.

Cooking Initiatives 
During the series, Oliver uses several different activities to get people cooking. He focuses on individuals teaching friends, workplaces providing cooking lessons, and the council providing free cooking lessons and information.  All the events and initiatives were designed such that they could be repeated and copied elsewhere, without Oliver's involvement.

 He teaches a small class composed of students who can't cook and asks them to pass the recipes they learn on to 2 friends each.  The class is composed of single mothers on benefits, busy working parents, bachelors, and an elderly man, all of whom responded to an advertisement in the local paper advertising free cooking classes for people who couldn't cook at all.
 He holds a 'Pass it On' style cooking lesson at the football field with men who signed up during the last football match (98 out of a crowd of 5000 signed up).  He teaches 2 people a dish, who then each teach 2 more people, and so on.
 He organizes a large-scale 'Workplace Pass it On' activity that several local large employers sign up for.  During one day, 1000 people learn a new, simple dish.  The employees teach each other the dish in groups of 50. 
 He organizes small cooking lessons where one of his students teaches a small group of people in the workplace how to make a recipe.  The idea is that companies could organize these types of quick lessons during lunch breaks.
 He sets up a 'Ministry of Food' headquarters in the town square.  The centre provided cooking demonstrations and recipes. Eventually, he hopes the town council will fund its continuing existence.
 He has his original class of students organize block parties with their neighbours, where they will teach some recipes.
 He organizes a Food Festival and invites neighbouring city councils to come learn about what they've been doing, in hopes that they will set up their own programs to help people to learn how to cook.

The People 
The series particularly focuses on a few members of his class of students.

Natasha Whiteman is a 22-year-old single mother of two, living on benefits.  Prior to the show, she had never cooked a meal for her kids.  They ate take-aways for dinner, primarily kebab and chips with cheese and the drawers in her refrigerator were filled with chocolate bars.  She turns out to be one of Oliver's most willing students.  She even started a small vegetable garden on her own initiative after learning that her little girl thought kebabs came from a plant. By the end of the series, Natasha showed such a flair and enthusiasm for cooking that Oliver helped her get a placement at the local catering school.

Claire Hallam is another mother of two, living on benefits.  Prior to the show, she was eating 10 packets of crisps a day and didn't even know what boiling water looked like.  She acknowledged that her family ate take-away for dinner 4 nights a week. By the end of the series, her fridge is filled with fresh produce and she's added a table and chairs to the kitchen.

Mick the Miner had never cooked a meal in his life.  The first dish he ever cooked was when he learned the prosciutto chicken dish during the 'pass it on' lesson at the football pitch.  He then joined Oliver's cooking class and became an enthusiastic cook and supporter of his campaign.

Julie Critchlow, who vocally opposed Oliver's activities in Jamie's School Dinners, also appears on the show.  Jamie asks her to help out by giving her honest opinion of what will and won't work, since he recognizes that he'll have to convince pessimists and critics like her if he's to succeed.

Results of the Campaign
As of May 2009, 16 town councils have expressed interest in setting up their own Ministry of Food Centres. Currently there are five areas that have active centres - Bradford, Leeds, North-East, Rotherham and Stratford

References

External links
 http://www.jamieoliver.com/jamies-ministry-of-food/
 

Channel 4 original programming
2008 British television series debuts
2008 British television series endings
British cooking television shows
English-language television shows